Reparenting is a form of psychotherapy in which the therapist actively assumes the role of a new or surrogate parental figure for the client, in order to treat psychological disturbances caused by defective, even abusive, parenting. The underlying assumption is that all mental illness results principally from such parenting, even including schizophrenia and bipolar disorder.

History
In the late 1960s, Jacqui Lee Schiff developed a form of therapy based on transactional analysis theory. She would dub this form of therapy as total regression reparenting. Schiff and her followers claimed success with curing clients with schizophrenia using reparenting, which resulted in the expansion of its practice. The promising findings of reparenting by Schiff led other therapists to develop their own application and forms of reparenting. The other most notable forms of reparenting that later came include time-limited, spot, and self-reparenting. Some people consider reparenting to be one of the many forms of New Age psychotherapy.

Mechanism
Deriving from transactional analysis theory, reparenting seeks to treat problems associated with defective parenting. The theory of reparenting states that psychological problems due to defective parenting can be overcome by reforming the parent ego state of the client. This is achieved by regressing the client to a state of mind that is vulnerable to new experiences, called the child ego state in transactional analysis theory. Once the client is in the child ego state, the therapist adopts the role of the client's parent and attempts to correctly reparent the client. The nature of reparenting by the therapist should be more positive and influence the client into developing a healthier parent ego state, which ultimately negates the psychological problems the client may have experienced before reparenting therapy.

Methods
Due to the wide varying forms of reparenting, each therapist may adopt different methods when treating clients. However, the mechanism that underlie the theory of reparenting is generally agreed upon. Typically, reparenting starts with the regression of the client to the child ego state. The therapist accomplishes this by partaking in child-rearing acts such as bottle feeding, lap pillows, and other techniques wherein the client consciously adopts physical positions and behaviors of a small child. These actions will also gain the client's trust in the therapist as his or her new parent. Once the ideal level of closeness is achieved, the therapist can finally proceed to providing the messages that reform the client's negative way of thinking by lecturing, entering discussions, or other forms of communication appropriate in a parent-child relationship.

Forms of Reparenting

Total Regression
Developed by Jaqui Lee Schiff, this form of reparenting was the first form of therapy built upon transactional analysis theory. Typically, the patient lives with the therapist for up to several years at an institution. During this time, the patient is totally immersed in the reliving of his or her childhood. The therapist provides all the care and nurturing with the goal of totally reforming the client's parent ego state. Total regression reparenting is famously associated with the Cathexis Institution, which was founded by Jaqui Lee Schiff.

Time-Limited Regression
Thomas Wilson developed time-limited regression reparenting for the purpose of treating patients with schizophrenia. But unlike Schiff's therapy, the patient is only required to attend five two-hour sessions with the therapist instead of living with the therapist. Nurturing is also more intensive and more structured than total regression reparenting.

Spot Reparenting
Spot reparenting was developed by Russell Osnes. In addition to also being less time intensive than Schiff's total regression reparenting, Osnes's form of reparenting focuses more on patients traumatized by specific experiences and incidents rather than by general disturbances in childhood.

Self-Reparenting
Self-reparenting was developed by Muriel James. Unlike prior forms of reparenting, James's form of reparenting did not attempt to totally replace the parent ego state of the client. Instead, the therapy confirms the positive aspects already apparent in the client's ego. The client is also the primary agent in therapy instead of the therapist.

Del Casale's Method
Developed by Del Casale, this form of reparenting, like Wilson's time-limited regression reparenting, focused primarily on treatment for schizophrenic patients. But unlike both Schiff and Wilson, Del Casale proposes that the therapist does not play the role of the parent for the client. Instead, Del Casale had the client's actual parents become an active participator in the therapy. Del Casale bases this model on the belief that some parts of the client's parent ego state is still healthy, and that defective parenting is not at the fault of the parents, but of the weak communication between the parent and child.

Efficacy

Kline Case
Dr. David Kline practiced Schiff's total regression reparenting and was a staff member of the Cathexis Institute. Among his most noted clients was a young girl diagnosed with severe anorexia nervosa. Dr. Kline theorized that the patient's anorexia was due to her mother's strict expectations. Reparenting was then used to counteract the negative influence of the patient's mother's parenting style. According to the patient, the therapy was a success, and she now lives with more confidence in her image as suggested by her therapist's reparenting.

Biochemical 
Jaqui Lee Schiff conducted a study to attain biochemical evidence for reparenting's effectiveness on schizophrenics. Schiff based this study on the observation that individuals with schizophrenia tend to have low levels of tryptophan reuptake. In the study, 20 patients diagnosed with schizophrenia were divided into three groups: a group going through reparenting treatment at the Cathexis Institute, a group going through separate treatment at the Lafayette Institute, and a control group that did not receive reparenting treatment. The results show that the subjects going through reparenting treatment at the Cathexis and Lafayette Institute had a mean tryptophan reuptake of 3.32 and 3.75 respectively. The control group had a group mean of 2.13. The numbers show that subjects that received reparenting had significantly higher tryptophan reuptake at the end of the experiment.

Self-Esteem
Lilian M. Wissink conducted a study to determine self-reparenting's effect on self-esteem. Human subjects were divided into two groups, a treatment group that consisted of 10 people, and a control group that consisted of 12 people. The sample group was made up of students and staff from a rural university, and only the treatment group went through self-reparenting treatment. The subjects were given questionnaires to measure their level of self-esteem before and after treatment. The result showed that subjects that received self-reparenting had significantly increased levels of self-esteem while the control group had decreased levels of self-esteem.

Crime Rehabilitation
A psychologist by the name of Gloria Noriega conducted a study to analyze the effects of self-reparenting on female delinquents in jail, who were between the ages of eleven and eighteen. In the study, all of the subjects received exactly the same treatment to support the theory that the effects of self-reparenting can be directly replicated. According to the results, twenty seven of the twenty eight subjects expressed less aggression, fewer conflicts with parents, increased motivation to achieve goals, and increased self-esteem in comparison to how they were before treatment. The subject that didn't show change was a drug abuser and clinicians concluded that more specialized treatment was required.

Controversies

Terminology and Definitions
Although reparenting is widely practiced, there is no set system of terminology among practitioners. In addition, the definitions of commonly used terms differ in definition among practitioners. The vagueness produced by these two weaknesses present danger of miscommunication between the therapist and the patient during treatment. The patient may also not fully understand the information shared with them when contracting or terminating treatment.

Therapist-Patient Relationship
The nature of reparenting often requires the therapist to develop a close relationship with the client. There is no protocol to provide the boundary as to what the therapist can or cannot do. Often, it is up to the therapist to determine the plan of action to take when faced with a dilemma during treatment.

Frame of Reference
There is no way to objectively determine the success in completely replacing the client's parent ego state after reparenting therapy. The therapist can only rely on the client's subjective statement, which may conflict with the therapist's account of the results. This conflict leads to questioning whether the therapy actually succeeded in reforming the Parent ego state.

Monitoring
This problem is especially true for total regression reparenting. Clients in therapy are totally immersed in an environment that promotes regression into the child ego state. However, during this time at which the client may spend months or years, the client is left at the mercy of the therapist and the institution.

Scientific Efficacy
Although some studies have been done to prove the efficacy of reparenting, the amount of statistically powerful studies available are few. Few studies try to confirm the mechanism or isolate moderating variables of reparenting.

References

New Age practices
Parenting
Transactional analysis
Psychotherapies